Changzhutan  or Chang-Zhu-Tan, also Greater Changsha Metropolitan Region or Changsha-Zhuzhou-Xiangtan City Cluster is a city cluster in Hunan province, China, consisting of the provincial capital, Changsha and two other prefecture-level cities: Xiangtan and Zhuzhou; it is the main heavily urbanized region of Hunan and covers an area of .

Economist Intelligence Unit identified Chang-Zhu-Tan as one of China's 13 megalopolises in its 2012 report "Supersized Cities", with an estimated 2010 population of 8.3 million and 2009 GDP of 320 million Chinese yuan (CNY) Other sources put the population at 5.92 million.

It covers an area of 1,883 km2 in the urban area with a population of 5.92 million, GDP reaches 568 billion CNY (US$90 billion), GDP per capita of 96,067 CNY (US$15,665), the core area of three cities (Changzhutan metropolis) had an area of 483.77 km2 in 2012. On December 14, 2007, it was issued as Comprehensive Supporting Reform Trial Areas to build a resource conserving and environment friendly society by China NDRC.

The Changsha–Zhuzhou–Xiangtan intercity railway connects the three urban cores and surrounding areas.

The area has been given a unified telephone area code.

References

Metropolitan areas of China
Geography of Hunan